Larry V. Parman is an American attorney whose practice centers on business succession and transaction planning and estate planning.  He also serves as a business coach and consultant to CEOs and business owners through a strategic affiliate.

He is the author of Above The Fray: Leading Yourself, Your Business and Others During Turbulent Times, published in January 2013. In addition, Parman has authored other books and numerous articles on estate planning, business succession challenges and preparing a business for sale.

Parman served as the Oklahoma Secretary of Commerce and Executive Director of the Oklahoma Department of Commerce, having been appointed by Governor Mary Fallin in October, 2013 to commence on November 1, 2013.  Prior to being named Secretary of Commerce, Parman was the 32nd Oklahoma Secretary of State, also having been appointed by Governor Mary Fallin. He served from March 1, 2011 until he resigned effective November 1, 2013 to assume his duties at Commerce.

Parman serves on the board of the Oklahoma State Chamber of Commerce, the Committee of 100 in Oklahoma City, and the Oklahoma Council on Public Affairs ("OCPA").  OCPA is an independent public policy organization that formulates and promotes public policy research and analysis consistent with the principles of free enterprise and limited government.  In October 2016, he was selected as Chairman of the OCPA Board of Trustees.  He is an active member of the Oklahoma City Rotary Club 29, the largest Rotary club in the world.  Past board memberships include the Oklahoma City chapter of Junior Achievement and the Research Institute for Economic Development ("RIED").

Mr. Parman received his undergraduate degree from the University of Missouri, where he was selected as a member of the prestigious Mystical 7 Organization honoring seven outstanding seniors for their leadership and service to the campus and community. He earned his Juris Doctor from the University of Missouri-Kansas City.

References

External links

Living people
Politicians from Oklahoma City
Oklahoma lawyers
Secretaries of State of Oklahoma
Heads of Oklahoma state agencies
Oklahoma Republicans
Lawyers from Oklahoma City
Year of birth missing (living people)